The Yonex Ladies Golf Tournament is an annual event on the LPGA of Japan Tour. It was first played in 1999. The host venue is the Yonex Country Club in Niigata Prefecture. The 2021 prize money is ¥70,000,000 the winner's share is ¥12,600,000.

Winners
2021 Ritsuko Ryu
2020 Cancelled
2019 Momoko Ueda
2018 Shiho Oyama
2017 Serena Aoki
2016 Porani Chutichai
2015 Shiho Oyama
2014 Misuzu Narita
2013 Junko Omote
2012 Shanshan Feng
2011 Hiromi Mogi
2010 Jeon Mi-jeong
2009 Jeon Mi-jeong
2008 Rui Kitada
2007 Yuri Fudoh
2006 Shiho Oyama
2005 Hyun-Ju Shin
2004 Yukari Baba
2003 Miho Koga
2002 Yuri Fudoh
2001 Yuri Fudoh
2000 Kyoko Ono
1999 Natsuko Noro

External links
 

LPGA of Japan Tour events
Golf tournaments in Japan
Sport in Niigata Prefecture